The  Atlanta Falcons season was the team's 26th season in the National Football League (NFL). It was also the final season they played at Fulton County Stadium, before moving into the Georgia Dome the following season. The season would be the most successful Atlanta had compiled in almost a decade, with the team recording a winning record for the first time in nine years. Additionally, the Falcons won their first playoff game since 1978, by defeating the New Orleans Saints in the NFC Wild Card Game before losing to the eventual Super Bowl champion Washington Redskins in the divisional round.

Offseason

NFL draft

The Falcons’ most notable selection in the 1991 NFL draft was future Hall of Fame quarterback Brett Favre, who was drafted in the second round, 33rd overall. Head coach Jerry Glanville disapproved of the selection and said it would take a plane crash for him to put Favre into the game. Favre's first pass in an NFL regular season game resulted in an interception returned for a touchdown. He only attempted four passes in his career at Atlanta, completing none of them. After the season ended, Favre was traded to the Green Bay Packers, where he remained for the following sixteen seasons. He went on to lead the Packers to eleven playoff appearances, two Super Bowl appearances, and their third Super Bowl title in Super Bowl XXXI. Favre also won three consecutive MVP awards, and was a 9-time Pro Bowler during his tenure in Green Bay.

Personnel

Staff

Roster

Regular season

Schedule

Standings

Game summaries

Week 1

Week 2

Week 3

Week 4

Week 5

Week 7

Week 8

Week 9

    
    
    
    
    
    
    

Michael Haynes 4 Rec, 110 Yds

Week 10

Week 11

Week 12

Week 13

Week 14

Week 15

Week 16

Week 17

Playoffs

Wild Card

Falcons quarterback Chris Miller completed the game-winning 61-yard touchdown pass to wide receiver Michael Haynes with 2:41 left in the contest. Miller completed 18 out of 30 passes for 291 yards and 3 touchdowns.

Divisional

During their regular season meeting, Washington defeated Atlanta 56–17, with quarterback Mark Rypien throwing for 446 yards and 6 touchdowns. In this game the score was closer, but the result was still the same.

Under rainy and muddy conditions, the Redskins forced six turnovers, held the ball for over 36 minutes, and scored two touchdowns in a span of 3:11 in the second quarter.

References

External links
 1991 Atlanta Falcons at Pro-Football-Reference.com

Atlanta
Atlanta Falcons seasons
Atlanta